Hackney Museum is a local history museum located in the London Borough of Hackney. Amongst other aspects of the Hackney area, the museum explores the history of immigration.

References

External links
 

Museums in the London Borough of Hackney
Local museums in London
Hackney, London